The Swabian Keuper-Lias Plains is a major natural region in southwest Germany and includes the southwesternmost part of the Keuper Uplands, which is bordered immediately to the north by the Swabian Jura.

Natural regions 
The Swabian Keuper lands are divided into three natural regional groups and their 3-figure major units which are given 3-figure numbers: 
 10 (=D58) Swabian Keuper-Lias Plains 
 100 Foreland of the western Swabian Jura (Vorland der mittleren Schwäbischen Alb)
 101 Foreland of the central Swabian Jura (Vorland der mittleren Schwäbischen Alb)
 102 Foreland of the eastern Swabian Jura (Vorland der östlichen Schwäbischen Alb)
 103 Nördlinger Ries 
 104 Schönbuch and Glemswald 
 Rammert
 Schönbuch
 Glemswald
 105 Stuttgart Bay 
 106 Filder
 107 Schurwald and Welzheim Forest
 Schurwald
 Lower Rems Valley
 Welzheim Forest
 108 Swabian-Franconian Forest (Schwäbisch-Fränkischer Wald)
 Heilbronn Hills
 Löwenstein Hills
 Mainhardt Forest
 Waldenburg Hills
 Murrhardt Forest
 Limpurg Hills
 Ellwangen Hills
 Virngrund

References

Sources 
 BfN landscape fact file for Baden-Württemberg and Bavaria - all landscapes with a five-digit number beginning with "10" belong to the Swabian Keuper-Lias Plains; the first three digits stand for the major unit.